Shimon Kagan  (born 6 April 1942, in Tel Aviv) is an Israeli chess master.

He was Israeli Champion in 1967 and 1969. He tied for 4-5th at Netanya 1968 (Bobby Fischer won), tied for 9-10th at Netanya 1969 (Samuel Reshevsky won), took 9th at Netanya 1971 (Lubomir Kavalek and Bruno Parma won). 

Kagan played for Israel in nine Chess Olympiads.
 In 1966, at fourth board in 17th Chess Olympiad in Havana (+4 –6 =1);
 In 1968, at fourth board in 18th Chess Olympiad in Lugano (+9 –1 =3);
 In 1970, at first board in 19th Chess Olympiad in Siegen (+10 –3 =3);
 In 1972, at first board in 20th Chess Olympiad in Skopje (+5 –7 =5);
 In 1974, at fourth board in 21st Chess Olympiad in Nice (+11 –1 =4);
 In 1976, at first reserve board in 22nd Chess Olympiad in Haifa (+5 –2 =2);
 In 1978, at third board in 23rd Chess Olympiad in Buenos Aires (+3 –4 =2);
 In 1980, at first reserve board in 24th Chess Olympiad in La Valletta (+3 –3 =0);
 In 1982, at second reserve board in 25th Chess Olympiad in Lucerne (+2 –1 =4).
He won two individual medals; gold at Lugano 1968, and bronze at Nice 1974.

Kagan was awarded the International Master (IM) title in 1969.

References

External links

1942 births
Living people
Israeli Jews
Israeli chess players
Jewish chess players
Chess International Masters
Chess Olympiad competitors
People from Tel Aviv